Syngnathus chihiroe is a species of pipefish which was described in 2017 following the collection of a single specimen in the East China Sea off Yakushima, southern Japan, from a depth of . The specimen has different counts of fin rays and a relatively short snout which distinguished it from the only other congener in the area Syngnathus schlegeli.

References

Fish described in 2017
chihiroe